Dvořáček (feminine Dvořáčková) is a Czech surname. Notable people include:

 Alois Dvořáček, Czech basketball player
 David Dvořáček, Czech ice hockey player
 Dusty Dvoracek, American football player
 Hermann Dvoracek, Austrian footballer
 Josef Dvořáček, Czech table tennis player
 Ladislav Dvořáček, Czech philatelist
 Ludvík Dvořáček, Czech basketball player
 Vladimír Dvořáček, Czech ice hockey player

See also 
 Dvorak (disambiguation)

Czech-language surnames